Zohab (also Romanized as Zohāb; also known as Qal‘eh Zohāb) is a village in Bizaki Rural District, Golbajar District, Chenaran County, Razavi Khorasan Province, Iran. At the 2006 census, its population was 45, in 10 families.

References 

Populated places in Chenaran County